Raymond McCreesh (25 February 1957 – 21 May 1981) was an Irish volunteer in the South Armagh Brigade of the Provisional Irish Republican Army (IRA). In 1976, he and two other IRA volunteers were captured while attempting to ambush a British Army observation post. McCreesh was one of the ten Irish republicans who died during the 1981 Irish hunger strike in the Maze Prison.

Background
Raymond Peter McCreesh, the seventh in a family of eight children, was born in St Malachy's Park, Camlough, on 25 February 1957. He was born into a strong Irish republican family, and was active in the republican movement from the age of 16. McCreesh attended the local primary school in Camlough, St Malachy's, and later attended St Colman's College in Newry. Raymond first joined Fianna Éireann, the IRA's youth wing, in 1973, and later that year he progressed to join the Provisional IRA South Armagh Brigade. McCreesh had worked for a short time as steelworker in a predominantly Protestant factory in Lisburn. However, as sectarian threats and violence escalated, he switched professions to work as a milk roundsman in his local area of South Armagh: an occupation which greatly increased his knowledge of the surrounding countryside, as well as enabling him to observe the movements of British Army patrols in the area.

Arrest
On 25 June 1976, McCreesh (aged 19) and three other IRA volunteers attempted to ambush a British Army observation post (OP) in South Armagh. It lay opposite the Mountain House Inn, on the Newry–Newtonhamilton Road. As the armed, masked and uniformed IRA volunteers approached the OP, they were spotted by British paratroopers on a hillside. The paratroopers opened fire on the volunteers, who scattered. Two of them, McCreesh and Paddy Quinn, took cover in a nearby farmhouse. The paratroopers surrounded the house and fired a number of shots into the building. After some time, McCreesh and Quinn surrendered and were taken to Bessbrook British Army base. The third volunteer, Danny McGuinness, had taken cover in a disused quarry outhouse but was captured the next day. The fourth member of the unit managed to escape despite being shot in the leg, arm and chest. Local Catholic priests facilitated their surrender.

Imprisonment and hunger strike
On 2 March 1977, McCreesh and Quinn were sentenced to fourteen years in prison for the attempted murder of British soldiers, possession of a rifle and ammunition, and a further five years for IRA membership. The rifle that McCreesh had in his possession when captured was one of those used in the Kingsmill massacre on 5 January 1976, when 10 Protestant civilians were shot dead. 

McCreesh was sent to the Maze Prison. He joined the blanket protest and took part in the 1981 Irish hunger strike. He died on 21 May, after 61 days on hunger strike.

One of the soldiers who captured McCreesh, Lance Corporal David Jones, was later killed by Francis Hughes, who died during the same hunger strike.

Raymond McCreesh Park
A Newry playground was named after McCreesh after a motion led by Sinn Féin, SDLP and independent representatives on Newry and Mourne District Council was passed. Unionists were unhappy with this and appealed to the Equality Commission which called for an equality impact assessment in 2008. The council sub-committee responsible for the assessment decided that naming the park after McCreesh complies with their legal requirement to "promote equality of opportunity and good relations between persons of different religious belief and political opinion".

In 2013, it was announced that the decision to name the park after McCreesh would be formally investigated by the Equality Commission for Northern Ireland. It said its investigation would consider whether the council had failed to have due regard to the need to promote equality and good relations between people of different religious beliefs and political opinion. Nothing came of the investigation.

References

1957 births
1981 deaths
Irish republicans
Irish republicans imprisoned on charges of terrorism
Irish people convicted of attempted murder
People educated at St Colman's College, Newry
People from County Armagh
People who died on the 1981 Irish hunger strike
Provisional Irish Republican Army members